Giovanni Scher (21 October 1915 in Koper, Austria-Hungary – 1992) was an Italian rower who competed in the 1932 Summer Olympics.

In 1932 he won the silver medal as coxswain of the Italian boat in the coxed fours competition.

External links
Giovanni Scher's profile at databaseOlympics.com

Giovanni Scher's profile at the Italian Olympic Committee

1915 births
1992 deaths
Sportspeople from Koper
Italian male rowers
Coxswains (rowing)
Olympic rowers of Italy
Rowers at the 1932 Summer Olympics
Olympic silver medalists for Italy
Olympic medalists in rowing
Medalists at the 1932 Summer Olympics